Asure Software is a software company. Prior to September 13, 2007, the company was known as Forgent Networks. After rebranding as Asure Software, the company expanded into offering human capital management (HCM) solutions, including payroll, time & attendance, talent management, human resource management, benefits administration and insurance services.

It also had a software division, NetSimplicity, which specialized in room scheduling and fixed assets' management software., which was spun off in 2019.

Patents and litigation

JPEG
In 2002, while known as Forgent, the company claimed that through its subsidiary, Compression Labs, it owned the patent rights on the JPEG image compression standard, which is widely used on the World Wide Web. Its claim arose from a patent that had been filed on October 27, 1986, and granted on October 6, 1987:  by Wen-Hsiung Chen and Daniel J. Klenke. While Forgent did not own Compression Labs at the time, Chen later sold the company to Forgent before joining Cisco.

Critics claim that the legal principle of laches, hence not asserting one's rights in a timely manner, invalidates Forgent's claims on the patent. They also noted the similarity to Unisys' attempts to assert rights over the GIF image compression standard via LZW patent enforcement. The JPEG committee responded to Forgent's claims, stating that it believes prior art exists that would invalidate Forgent's claims, and launched a search for prior art evidence. The 1992 JPEG specification cited two earlier research papers written by Wen-Hsiung Chen, published in 1977 and 1984.  JPEG representative Richard Clark also claimed that Chen sat in one of the JPEG committees, but Forgent denied this claim.

In April 2004, Forgent stated that 30 companies had already paid US$90 million in royalties. On April 23, lawsuits were filed against 31 companies, including Adobe Systems, Apple Computer and IBM, for infringement of their patent. On September 26, 2005, Axis Communications, one of the defendants, announced a settlement with Compression Labs Inc.; the terms were not disclosed. As of late October 2005, six companies were known to have licensed the patent from Forgent including Adobe, Macromedia, Axis, Color Dreams, and Research In Motion.

On May 25, 2006, the United States Patent and Trademark Office rejected the broadest part of Forgent's claims, stating prior art submitted by the Public Patent Foundation invalidated those claims. PubPat's Executive Director, Dan Ravicher, says that the submitters knew about the prior art but failed to tell the USPTO about it. On August 11, 2006, Forgent received notice from the NASDAQ stock market regarding non-compliance with the minimum bid price rule, which can lead to delisting, before coming back into compliance in January 2007.

The company issued a press release on November 1, 2006, stating that they settled their remaining claims against roughly 60 companies for a total of $8 million which was paid by, among other companies, Dell, Hewlett-Packard, IBM, Microsoft, and Sun Microsystems.

Digital video recorders
Forgent Networks shifted its focus to a computer controlled video system, allowing playback during recording. While the patent was filed in 1991, the first litigation was initiated in 2005. On May 21, 2007, U.S. District Court of Eastern Texas ruled in favor of EchoStar Communications Corporation, on grounds that the Forgent patent is invalid.

Asure Software
After Forgent Networks acquired iEmployee and changed its name to Asure Software, the website of the combined company no longer listed information related to the two patents - '672 and '746, unlike the old Forgent Networks website.

Proxy Fight
In 2008, the company was the target of a proxy fight launched by Pinnacle Fund ("Pinnacle") and Red Oak Partners, managed by David Sandberg. After negotiations, a slate of 5 new directors was elected on August 28, 2009 to replace the previous board.

Acquisitions
On September 13, 2007, Forgent acquired iEmployee.

On October 3, 2011, Asure Software announced that it had acquired ADI Time, a  vendor of cloud computing time and attendance software and labor management services. On March 21, 2016, it announced the acquisition of Mangrove Employer Services, which developed  human resource management software; it began massive layoffs of previous Mangrove employees  in June 2016.

In May 2017, Asure acquired the Tampa-based company Compass HRM Inc.  In May 2017, it  acquired iSystems LLC, creators of the Evolution payroll service-bureau software. In January  2018 it acquired  Sheakley PaySystems in a move to acquire their  clients in the Midwest. 
.  In April 2018, Asure acquired Austin HR, an Austin based HR Consulting & Payroll & Benefit Administration company.  On December 2, 2019, Asure Software announced that it completed the sale of its Workspace Management Business to FM:Systems.

References

External links
 Forgent Related News Stories at The Data Compression News Blog
 https://web.archive.org/web/20160324072837/http://www.asuresoftware.com/about-us/news-item/asure-software-acquires-mangrove-software/

Patent monetization companies of the United States
Software companies based in Texas
Companies based in Austin, Texas
Companies listed on the Nasdaq
Software companies of the United States